Acoustic Station is Pakistan's first music web series that produces live music performed in a studio featuring new and established artists. A concept of Kashan Admani, Acoustic Station focuses on introducing the sound of acoustic ensemble recorded live in a studio.

Format 
The concept of the show was created by founder and producer Kashan Admani. The web series features new and cover songs with unplugged arrangements having jazz influences. Each episode is released on Wednesday on digital mediums and features a unique artist with a different set of band. In an interview with The News International, Kashan Admani said that the show focuses on bringing new talent to the limelight through unplugged music. He explained that they did not associate with a brand because it is good for the music scene.

Launch 
Season 1 was launched in Karachi in Dream Station Productions. In the launch ceremony, producer Kashan Admani shared the idea behind the show and how he expects it to introduce the audience to new instruments and unplugged sounds.

Season 1 
Acoustic Station Season 1 was opened by the band Kashmir with their song "Soch". There are a total of 14 episodes in this season. In the second episode, Maha Ali Kazmi appeared and sang a cover of the Kashmiri song "Sahibo". The third episode featured Latif Ali Khan who performed a Saraiki song titled "Lolak". The fourth episode featured Nida Hussain with the original song "Jee Loon". The fifth episode featured Hamza Akram Qawwal with "Karde Karam". The sixth episode featured a new band named Rusted Rose with their original song "Cut Me". The seventh episode featured Zeeshan Ali with Shallum Asher Xavier for a Punjabi track titled "Sukh". In the eighth episode, Chand Taara Orchestra paid a tribute to Ghalib with a cover of his ghazal "Andaaz-e-Guftugoo". The ninth episode featured the band Tamaasha with the original song "Faaslay". The tenth episode of the show was headlined by Muhammad Zubair with the original ghazal "Maloom Hai", composed and produced by Kashan Admani. The eleventh episode saw Natasha Baig with a rendition of "Dur Ze Darya" featuring Kashan Admani on guitar, Remesha Janjua on backing vocals, along with others. Hamza Akram Qawwal returned to Acoustic Station in the 12th episode, becoming the only artist to appear twice in the show, with a rendition of Nusrat Fateh Ali Khan's "Chain Na Aaway". Latif Ali Khan reappeared in the 13th episode and covered Ustad Nusraf Fateh Ali Khan's "Chain Na Aaway".

See also 

MTV Unplugged
Nescafé Basement
 Uth Records
Pepsi Battle of the Bands
Coke Studio (Pakistani TV program)

References

External links 

 Acoustic Station on Facebook 
 Acoustic Station on YouTube
Acoustic Station on Apple Music

Pakistani music television series
Rock music television series
Pop music television series
Pakistani web series
2019 Pakistani television series debuts